Louise Føns (born 18 February 1985) is a Danish handball player and journalist, who currently plays for København Håndbold.

References

1985 births
Living people
People from Kolding
Danish female handball players
Sportspeople from the Region of Southern Denmark